The 2008 Dehradun Municipal Corporation election was a municipal election to the Dehradun Municipal Corporation, which governs Dehradun, the largest city in Uttarakhand.

Vinod Chamoli of the Bharatiya Janata Party was elected mayor. The BJP won 28 of the 60 seats, and the Indian National Congress won 24.

Mayoral election

Position of the house

See also
2008 Uttarakhand local elections

References

External links
 Official Website of the Dehradun Municipal Corporation

Dehradun Municipal Corporation
Dehradun
Local elections in Uttarakhand
2008 elections in India